WACX (channel 55) is a religious independent television station licensed to Leesburg, Florida, United States, serving the Orlando area. Locally owned by Associated Christian Television System, Inc., the station maintains studios on Central Parkway in Altamonte Springs, and its transmitter is located near Bithlo, Florida.

WACX operates on a commercial license, even though it, like most religious stations, is supported through donations from viewers. Its schedule consists primarily of national and local religious programming.

The station's owner, Associated Christian Television System, Inc. is not the same entity as either American Christian Television Services, owner of WLMA in Lima, Ohio, or the defunct cable network the American Christian Television System.

History
WACX first signed on the air on March 6, 1982 as WIYE, operating on analog channel 55. However, it has roots in a local Christian cable station begun by Claud and Freeda Bowers in 1977.

Channel 55's signal originally didn't make it too far out of Lake County. However, the station had grown enough that by 1987 it was able to move to a new transmitter capable of 5 million watts of power, boosting its coverage area to the entire Central Florida area. It became WACX in 1988, and began branding itself as "SuperChannel 55" because at the time it was the only station airing at the maximum power allowed for a UHF station. (The WIYE calls now reside at a low-powered CBS affiliate in Parkersburg, West Virginia.)

From the 1990s through September 2006, WACX was affiliated with TBN, regularly airing select programs from the network; this affiliation ceased after TBN acquired its own station in the market. Since then, the station has regularly featured programming from The Inspiration Network (INSP) and periodically from God TV.

At one point, WACX controlled the SuperChannel TBN channel on the Sky Angel religious satellite service, but this was replaced with the national TBN service in 2006.

Technical information

Subchannels
The station's digital signal is multiplexed:

Analog-to-digital conversion
WACX shut down its analog signal, over UHF channel 55, in March 2006. The station's digital signal continued to be broadcast on its pre-transition UHF channel 40. Through the use of PSIP, digital television receivers display the station's virtual channel as its former UHF analog channel 55, which was among the high band UHF channels (52-69) that were removed from broadcasting use as a result of the transition.

Translator
WACX presently operates a digital translator station which rebroadcasts its signal into the Gainesville–Ocala area. In addition, programming from WACX's main channel is carried on a digital subchannel of WJGV-CD (channel 48) in Palatka.

Former translators
Previously, WACX operated a network of analog translators which rebroadcast its signal into other parts of Florida:

Majesty Building 

In 2001, Claud Bowers, the general manager of WACX, began construction of the Majesty Building, an 18-story office building in Altamonte Springs. However, no work was done on the building, which has been dubbed "The I-4 Eyesore" by many locals in the area, for over a decade. Construction largely resumed in 2018.

References

External links
 
WACX TV Lineup and Demographic Data

Television channels and stations established in 1982
ACX
1982 establishments in Florida
ACX